Narayan Choubey (born 12 January 1923, date of death unknown) was an Indian politician. He was elected to the Lok Sabha, lower house of the Parliament of India from Midnapore, West Bengal as a member of the Communist Party of India. In 2008, it was noted that Choubey is deceased.

References

External links
  Official Biographical Sketch in Lok Sabha Website

1923 births
Year of death missing
Communist Party of India politicians from West Bengal